St. Hyacinth's Church in Wierzbica Górna (Gmina Wołczyn), Poland, is a wooden church built in 1722. The church belongs to St. Hyacinth Parish in Wierzbica Górna, in the Namysłów-South Deanery of the Roman Catholic Archdiocese of Wrocław. Since April 18, 1964 the church was registered on the Register of Objects of Cultural Heritage for the Opole Voivodeship, with the registration number of 818/64.

References

Kluczbork County
Wierzbica Górna